Igor Miguel Castro Rocha (born 3 May 1984) is a Portuguese professional footballer who plays for Valadares Gaia Futebol Clube as a left back.

Club career
Born in Vila Nova de Gaia, Porto District, Rocha spent most of his career in the Segunda Liga after being formed at Boavista FC. He appeared in 216 matches at that level for C.D. Trofense, C.D. Santa Clara (two spells) and C.D. Feirense.

Rocha spent four seasons in the Primeira Liga, making a combined 26 appearances for Associação Naval 1º de Maio and Vitória de Setúbal. He made his debut in the competition while at the service of the former club, playing 63 minutes in a 0–2 home loss against S.L. Benfica on 17 February 2008.

References

External links

1984 births
Living people
Sportspeople from Vila Nova de Gaia
Portuguese footballers
Association football defenders
Primeira Liga players
Liga Portugal 2 players
Segunda Divisão players
Boavista F.C. players
G.D. Ribeirão players
C.F. União de Lamas players
S.C. Dragões Sandinenses players
Associação Naval 1º de Maio players
C.D. Trofense players
Vitória F.C. players
C.D. Feirense players
C.D. Santa Clara players
F.C. Vizela players
C.D. Fátima players